Dindarpur i(Deenpur) is a census town in Delhi, India. It is located in the Najafgarh tehsil of the Southwest Delhi district.

Overview 
Dindarpur is a census town in Delhi, India. Also known as Deenpur, it is located in the Najafgarh tehsil of the South West Delhi district. As of the 2011 census, it had a total population of 35,856 people comprising 19,121 males and 16,735 females.

Geography 

Dindarpur is surrounded by several essential colonies of the South West Delhi district. Like all the South West District of Delhi’s administrative subdivisions, Dindarpur is composed of a group of Colonies. Some Colonies around Dindarpur and under Ch. Bale Ram Numberdar are Shyam Vihar ph1 & ph2 (The Highest Population Colonies in Matiyala Vidhan Sabha), Durga Vihar, Shyam Enclave, Surya Vihar, Shiv Vihar, Sarika Vihar, Munrika Kunj, Bhavani Nagar, Gandhi Park, Dindarpur Extension. Dindarpur Village has different varieties of shops, including textiles, hardware, ornament, sports. Goyla More is the oldest place in Dindarpur. Max Garden is the most populated Garden for marriage and parties since 2004. Three liquor shops are available in Dindarpur.

Politics 
Pravesh Verma of BJP is the MP from this constituency while Gulab Singh Yadav of Aam Aadmi Party is MLA from this region. In 2012, as part of a government initiative, the Delhi government’s revenue department will step up action to free large tracts of gram sabha land, allotted to the education department for setting up schools.

References

 Villages in South West Delhi district

Delhi